At least two ships of the Argentine Navy have been named ARA General Belgrano:

 , was a  launched in 1896 and scrapped in 1953.
 , was a  launched in 1938 as USS Phoenix and renamed ARA 17 de Octubre on transfer to Argentina in 1951. She was renamed General Belgrano in 1956 and sunk in 1982.

Argentine Navy ship names